Nu Made (Remixes) is a remix album by the Israeli electronica-world fusion trio Balkan Beat Box. The album features remixes of songs from their second studio album Nu Med.

Track listing

References

Balkan Beat Box albums
JDub Records albums
2009 remix albums
Dub albums